The frilled nudibranch, Leminda millecra, is a species of metarminid nudibranch, and is only found in South Africa. It is a marine gastropod mollusc in the family Charcotiidae.

Distribution
This species is endemic to the South African coast and is found from the Atlantic coast of the Cape Peninsula to Port Elizabeth in 10–40 m. Deep water specimens have been trawled off the KwaZulu-Natal coast.

Description
The frilled nudibranch is a large (up to 90 mm) smooth-bodied nudibranch with a frilled appearance. Margins of the body have a bright bluish edge, and the body may have pink or brown pigmentation. The rhinophores are elongated and smooth, and emerge from a scrolled sheath. Branches of the digestive gland fill the frilled edge of the mantle.

Ecology
The egg mass of Leminda millecra consists of fat white convoluted curls with large eggs distinctly visible. It is reported to feed on the soft coral Alcyonium fauri.

References

Charcotiidae
Gastropods described in 1985